Guan Zhaozhi (February 13, 1919 – November 12, 1982) was a Chinese mathematician. He was a member of the Chinese Academy of Sciences.

Personal life 
His younger male cousin Guan Zhaoye was a architect and member of the Chinese Academy of Engineering (CAE).

References 

 

1919 births
1982 deaths
Members of the Chinese Academy of Sciences
20th-century Chinese mathematicians